Henri Léon Thiébaut (19 November 1880 in Paris – 13 October 1956 in Paris) was a French fencer who competed in the late 19th century and early 20th century. He participated in Fencing at the 1900 Summer Olympics in Paris and won the silver medal in the sabre. He was defeated by Georges de la Falaise in the final.

References

External links

1880 births
1956 deaths
French male sabre fencers
Olympic silver medalists for France
Olympic fencers of France
Fencers at the 1900 Summer Olympics
Sportspeople from Nice
Olympic medalists in fencing
Medalists at the 1900 Summer Olympics